The Mercedes-Benz Vaneo is a five-door, seven-seater compact MPV (M-segment in Europe) that was produced by Mercedes-Benz from 2002 to 2005. It used the automobile platform from the first generation Mercedes-Benz A-Class. Up to seven seater capacity was available, but this vehicle was not built as a van, instead it was built as a MPV. The name Vaneo is derived from the word Van, which is used in German for the car types MPV.

Design

The Vaneo was front-wheel-drive only and limited to four-cylinder engines. The body consisted of two sliding rear doors and 'Sandwich Floor' construction giving it a van-like driving position and a higher roof line. It was suitable for U.K.'s Motability for the disabled, as well as for use as taxicabs.

Seating for five was standard, with two third-row buckets optional. With all the rear seats removed, there was up to 3,000 litres of cargo space. A 120 kg capacity slide-out boot floor was optional. Roof rails were standard on Trend and Ambiente models, while ISOfix anchorages were included on all vehicles.

Due to quality issues and poor sales the Vaneo was discontinued after a three-year production run. It was replaced in the same year it was discontinued, by the similarly-sized B-Class

Safety
The Vaneo was tested by Euro NCAP in 2002 with the following ratings:

Security
The Vaneo was tested by Thatcham's New Vehicle Security Ratings (NVSR) organisation and achieved the following ratings:

Powertrains
Engines complied with Euro 3 emission standards. They included: 1.6 L in two states of tune and 1.9 L petrol engines, as well as a 1.7 L diesel. Three 5-speed transmissions were available: a manual, an automated clutch system called ACS, and a regular automatic called "TouchShift."

Reviews
Parker's Car Guides 'Pros: Interior space, usefully practical, easy to drive in townCons: Rattly trim, ungainly styling, firm ride'
RAC (6.4/10)'Don't let the uninspiring looks and twee name put you off. The Vaneo is well built and offers a surprising amount of space in its compact footprint. It won't win any beauty contests and inviting people for 'a spin in the Merc' might be a recipe for disappointment, but to know a Vaneo is to love one. Surprisingly good.'

References

Vaneo
Compact MPVs
Minivans
Front-wheel-drive vehicles
Euro NCAP small MPVs
Cars of Germany
Cars introduced in 2002
Cars discontinued in 2005